Zia Ul Shah is a citizen of Pakistan best known for the time he spent in extrajudicial detention in the United States Guantanamo Bay detention camps, in Cuba.
His Guantanamo Internment Serial Number was 15.

Zia Ul Shah was captured in Afghanistan in 2001 and transferred to Pakistan on 11 October 2006.

Combatant Status Review 

Ul Shah was among the 60% of prisoners who participated in the tribunal hearings. A Summary of Evidence memo was prepared for the tribunal of each detainee. The memo for his hearing lists the following allegations:

Administrative Review Board 

Detainees whose Combatant Status Review Tribunal labeled them "enemy combatants" were scheduled for annual Administrative Review Board hearings.  These hearings were designed to assess the threat a detainee might pose if released or transferred, and whether there were other factors that warranted his continued detention.

Shah chose to participate in his Administrative Review Board hearing.

The following factors favor continued detention

The following primary factors favor release or transfer

Formerly secret Joint Task Force Guantanamo assessment

On 25 April 2011, whistleblower organization WikiLeaks published formerly secret assessments drafted by Joint Task Force Guantanamo analysts.
His 5 page Joint Task Force Guantanamo assessment was drafted on.
It was signed by camp commandant Brigadier General Jay W. Hood. He recommended transfer to another country for continued detention.  The assessment noted an earlier assessment had recommended release or transfer, but that new information escalated concern.

McClatchy News Service interview

On 15 June 2008, the McClatchy News Service published a series of articles based on interviews with 66 former Guantanamo captives.
Zia Khalid Najib was one of the former captives who had an article profiling him.

The McClatchy article quoted Abdul Jabar Sabit, the Attorney General of Afghanistan, who visited Guantanamo and had interview Zia Khalid Najib.
The Attorney General commented on how the USA seemed to base its release decisions on how compliant captives were, while in custody.  He noted that the USA had released senior Taliban leaders who complied with the camp rules, while continuing to hold low-level foot-soldiers, or innocent victims of mistaken identity, who did not comply.

Zia Khalid Najib acknowledged that he had poor impulse control, and was routinely being punished by the guards provocations and Koran desecration:

Zia Khalid Najib told his McClatchy interviewers that his first interrogators asked him about serving as one of Osama bin Laden's drivers—an allegation he denied.
He confirmed he had driven low level Taliban fighters, but he had never driven anyone from Al Qaeda.  He said that interrogators stopped asking him about driving Bin Laden, but that many of his later interrogation sessions consisted largely of personality clashes:

The McClatchy article noted that among the justifications for Zia Khalid Najib's continued detention was that he knew senior Taliban members, and his rebuttal.
He attributed these allegations to incompetent translation.

References

External links
McClatchy News Service - video

Guantanamo detainees known to have been released
Pakistani extrajudicial prisoners of the United States
Living people
Year of birth missing (living people)